The men's 1500 metres competition in short track speed skating at the 2022 Winter Olympics was held on 9 February, at the Capital Indoor Stadium in Beijing. Hwang Dae-heon of South Korea became the Olympic champion, this was his first Olympic gold. Steven Dubois of Canada won silver, his first Olympic medal, and Semion Elistratov, representing the Russian Olympic Committee, bronze. Due to unusually high number of penalties and advancements in semi-finals, 10 athletes were competing in Final A.

The defending champion and the Olympic record holder Lim Hyo-jun, who now represents China after playing as a South Korean athlete at the 2018 Winter Olympics, did not enter the event. The silver medalist and world record holder, Sjinkie Knegt, and the bronze medalist, Semion Elistratov, qualified as well. Charles Hamelin was the 2021 World Short Track Speed Skating champion at the 1500 m  distance. Itzhak de Laat and Elistratov were the silver and bronze medalists, respectively. Many top athletes did not participate in the championship, however. Ren Ziwei was leading the 2021–22 ISU Short Track Speed Skating World Cup at the 1500 m distance with four races completed before the Olympics, followed by Elistratov and Park Jang-hyuk.

Qualification

Countries were assigned quotas based on their performance during the 2021–22 ISU Short Track Speed Skating World Cup, with the top 36 athletes (maximum of three per country qualifying quotas. If a NOC declined a quota spot, it was distributed to the next available athlete, only if the maximum quota of 56 athletes per gender was not surpassed.

Records
Prior to this competition, the existing world and Olympic records were as follows.

The following records were set during the competition.

Results

Quarterfinals
 Q – qualified for the semifinals
 ADV – advanced
 PEN – penalty
 OR - olympic record

Semifinals
 QA – qualified for Final A
 QB – qualified for Final B

Finals

Final B

Final A

References

Men's short track speed skating at the 2022 Winter Olympics